Niguimbe Préjuce Nakoulma (born 21 April 1987) is a Burkinabé professional footballer who most recently played as a striker for US Orléans and the Burkina Faso national team.

Club career
Nakoulma's former clubs were Stal Stalowa Wola and Hetman Zamość.

In July 2010, he was loaned to Widzew Łódź on a one-year deal. He returned to Łęczna one-year later, only to be immediately loaned to Górnik Zabrze, again on a one-year contract. After having scored 9 goals in the 2011–12 campaign while on loan, Nakoulma signed a permanent contract with Górnik Zabrze in July 2012.

On 17 July 2014, Nakoulma signed two-year contract with Turkish club Mersin İdman Yurdu.

After being released by Kayserispor Nakoulma signed for Ligue 1 side FC Nantes on 31 January 2017. In August 2018, he was released from his contract. In January 2019, Nakoulma signed for Çaykur Rizespor on a free transfer. He made his first appearance for Rizespor on 21 January as a substitute against Kasımpaşa. His first goal for Rizespor was scored on 27 January against Akhisar Belediyespor.

Nakoulma left Rizespor in the summer of 2019, and after six months without a club he signed for US Orléans in December 2019, on a contract until the end of the 2019–20. He left at the end of the contract.

Career statistics
Scores and results list Burkina Faso's goal tally first, score column indicates score after each Nakoulma goal.

Honors
Burkina Faso
Africa Cup of Nations silver: 2013
Africa Cup of Nations bronze: 2017

References

External links
 
 

Living people
1987 births
Sportspeople from Ouagadougou
Association football forwards
Burkinabé footballers
Burkinabé expatriate footballers
Burkina Faso international footballers
Süper Lig players
Ekstraklasa players
I liga players
Ligue 1 players
Ligue 2 players
Stal Stalowa Wola players
Commune FC players
Górnik Łęczna players
Widzew Łódź players
Górnik Zabrze players
Mersin İdman Yurdu footballers
Kayserispor footballers
FC Nantes players
Çaykur Rizespor footballers
US Orléans players
Expatriate footballers in Poland
Burkinabé expatriate sportspeople in Poland
Expatriate footballers in Turkey
Burkinabé expatriate sportspeople in Turkey
Expatriate footballers in France
Burkinabé expatriate sportspeople in France
2012 Africa Cup of Nations players
2013 Africa Cup of Nations players
2015 Africa Cup of Nations players
2017 Africa Cup of Nations players
Hetman Zamość players